John Long (born 1952) is an Irish retired Gaelic footballer. His league and championship career with the Kerry senior team spanned six seasons from 1972 to 1977.

Long made his debut on the inter-county scene at the age of seventeen when he was picked on the Kerry minor team having previously won an All-Ireland schools title, the Hogan Cup, with St. Brendan's Killarney in 1969. He enjoyed one season in this grade, ending the year as an All-Ireland runner-up. Long never played under-21 football with Kerry, however, he joined the senior team during the 1971-72 league. Over the course of the next six seasons, Long made a number of appearances on the team but failed to nail down a regular place on the starting fifteen. He won his sole All-Ireland medal as a non-playing substitute in 1975, while also winning three successive Munster medals from the bench and three National Football League medals, one of which was claimed on the field of play.

Honours

Kerry
All-Ireland Senior Football Championship (1): 1975
Munster Senior Football Championship (3): 1975, 1976, 1977
National Football League (3): 1971-72, 1973-74, 1976-77
Munster Minor Football Championship (1): 1970

References

1952 births
Living people
An Ghaeltacht Gaelic footballers
Kerry inter-county Gaelic footballers